Lisandro Joel Alzugaray (born 17 April 1990) is an Argentine professional footballer who plays as a winger.

Career
Alzugaray got his senior career underway with a four-year spell with Atlético Paraná, having played for Lanús at youth level. He was first moved into the first-team for the 2009–10 Torneo Argentino C campaign, but failed to feature as the club were promoted to Torneo Argentino B. Alzugaray made his first appearances during the following campaign, eventually scoring twenty-nine goals in eighty-seven matches for Atlético Paraná. On 9 July 2013, Alzugaray signed for Chaco For Ever of Torneo Argentino A. He made his debut against Juventud Unida on 18 August, prior to scoring his first goal in March 2014 versus San Jorge.

He completed a return to a recently promoted Torneo Federal A club Atlético Paraná on 30 June 2014. He netted five times in the 2014 season as the club won back-to-back promotions, beating Sportivo Patria in the play-offs for a spot in the 2015 Primera B Nacional. He subsequently played in sixty-three second tier fixtures and scored four goals across the next three campaigns. January 2017 saw Alzugaray leave his homeland for the first time after agreeing to join Bolivian Primera División team San José. He departed nine months later, rejoining Torneo Federal A's Chaco For Ever. Two goals in seventeen games came.

On 8 August 2018, Alzugaray completed a move to Argentine Primera División side Newell's Old Boys. His debut arrived on 25 October against Estudiantes, which was one of four appearances for the club before he departed to Central Córdoba in July 2019. After scoring goals in 2019–20 versus Talleres, Villa Mitre (cup), San Lorenzo (2) and Arsenal de Sarandí, Alzugaray headed abroad for a second time after signing with Ecuadorian Serie A outfit Aucas in July 2020. He netted against Mushuc Runa, Emelec, Guayaquil City, Independiente del Valle, Macará and Barcelona as they qualified for the Copa Sudamericana.

On 26 December 2020, Alzugaray was announced as a new signing for 2021 by fellow Ecuadorian top-flight club Universidad Católica; who had just secured a place in the Copa Libertadores.

On 1 August 2022, Alzugaray joined Saudi Arabian club Al Ahli on a one-year deal.

Career statistics
.

References

External links

1990 births
Living people
People from Paraná Department
Argentine footballers
Association football midfielders
Argentine expatriate footballers
Expatriate footballers in Bolivia
Expatriate footballers in Ecuador
Expatriate footballers in Saudi Arabia
Argentine expatriate sportspeople in Bolivia
Argentine expatriate sportspeople in Ecuador
Argentine expatriate sportspeople in Saudi Arabia
Torneo Argentino A players
Torneo Federal A players
Primera Nacional players
Bolivian Primera División players
Argentine Primera División players
Ecuadorian Serie A players
Club Atlético Paraná players
Chaco For Ever footballers
Club San José players
Newell's Old Boys footballers
Central Córdoba de Santiago del Estero footballers
S.D. Aucas footballers
C.D. Universidad Católica del Ecuador footballers
Al-Ahli Saudi FC players
L.D.U. Quito footballers
Sportspeople from Entre Ríos Province